The ÖBB Class 2143 is a class of diesel-hydraulic locomotives operated by Austrian Federal Railways (ÖBB) in Austria.

Technical specifications
The locomotives have a B-B wheel arrangement, and are powered by SGP T12c diesel motors. They are equipped with a Voith hydraulic transmission.

History
The locomotives were introduced in 1965. A total of 77 locomotives, numbered 2143.001 to 2143.077, have been built by Simmering-Graz-Pauker.

Locomotive 2143.21 is operated by the Stauden-Verkehrsgesellschaft (SVG). This locomotive was formerly also operated by the Wiener Lokalbahnen.

References

External links

ÖBB rolling stock information 

Austrian Federal Railways diesel locomotives